Ramunė is a Lithuanian feminine given name. People bearing the name Ramunė include:
Ramunė Arlauskienė (born 1973), Lithuanian mountain bike orienteer
Ramunė Adomaitienė (born 1968), Lithuanian parathlete 
Ramunė Kmieliauskaitė (born 1960), Lithuanian graphic artist and painter

See also

Ramūnas, Lithuanian male given name

References

Lithuanian feminine given names